Peter Sarkodie (born 13 March 1998) is a Ghanaian professional footballer who plays as a goalkeeper for Ghanaian Premier League side Dreams F.C.

Career

Unity Stars 
Sarkodie played for Ghana Division One League outfit Unity Stars before joining Dreams FC in 2018.

Dreams FC 
On 4 June 2018, Sarkodie was signed by Ghana Premier League side Dreams FC on transfer deadline day of the second transfer window ahead of the second round of the 2018 Ghanaian Premier League season as the club aimed at augmenting their squad. He signed a four-year contract to expire in 2022. He however did not make play for the club that season amidst the cancellation of the league due to the dissolution of the GFA on 8 June 2018, as a result of the Anas Number 12 Expose.

He made his debut on 3 April 2019, playing the full 90 minutes in a 1–1 draw against Karela United. He ended the 2019 GFA Normalization Committee Special Competition with 4 league matches. During the 2019–20 Ghana Premier League, he played 8 matches before the league was truncated due to the COVID-19 pandemic. Ahead of the 2020–21 Ghana Premier League season, he was named on the team's squad list as the league was set for a fresh start in November 2020. He was linked with a move to King Faisal Babies, following after falling on the perking orders following the signing of Philemon McCarthy and the performance of Solomon Agbesi during the season.

References

External links 

 

1998 births
Living people
Association football goalkeepers
Ghanaian footballers
Dreams F.C. (Ghana) players
Ghana Premier League players